Mario Pérez Saldívar (born March 13, 1939) is a retired long-distance runner from Mexico. He won the gold medal in the men's 5.000 metres event at the 1970 Central American and Caribbean Games, and competed for his native country at the 1972 Summer Olympics in Munich, West Germany.

Personal bests
5,000 metres — 13.45.8 (1971)

References

1939 births
Living people
Mexican male long-distance runners
Athletes (track and field) at the 1971 Pan American Games
Athletes (track and field) at the 1972 Summer Olympics
Olympic athletes of Mexico
Pan American Games bronze medalists for Mexico
Pan American Games medalists in athletics (track and field)
Central American and Caribbean Games gold medalists for Mexico
Competitors at the 1970 Central American and Caribbean Games
Central American and Caribbean Games medalists in athletics
Medalists at the 1971 Pan American Games
20th-century Mexican people